The SJ Class T43 is a Swedish diesel-electric locomotive originally operated by Swedish State Railways and later other companies. It was built by Nykvist & Holm (NOHAB) in 1961–63, and equipped with Electro-Motive Diesel engines. Eight of the locomotives are equipped with GM's multiple unit capability and be operated with up to three other GM locomotives. They remain in service as shunters for private railway companies.

History
The T43 made it possible to phase out steam locomotives in Sweden, with none left in service there after 1963. Until the mid-1980s the T43 was used on main-line services, both for passenger and freight trains. The main area of passenger service was on Blekingekustbanan. During the late 1980s the successor T44 took over more and more of the T43's duties. SJ took the T43 out of service in the 1990s, though some were transferred to Banverket and TGOJ, who in turn sold them to private railways that used them for freight and shunting services.

External links
 Järnväg.net on T43
Hector Rail on T43 (841)

Railway locomotives introduced in 1961
NOHAB locomotives
T43
Bo′Bo′ locomotives
Standard gauge locomotives of Sweden